Fan Club Event 2008: Let's Party Vol. 1 (stylized as FAN CLUB EVENT 2008「Let's Party Vol.1」) is the first Fan club Exclusive DVD from Japanese star Koda Kumi. It features a performance of eleven concerts held in seven different locations throughout Japan. The DVD was sold for a limited time.

The DVD contains a questionnaire for every area visited. Whichever ranked the highest was the performance Koochan gave in that area.

Track listing
Official track list.

References

2009 video albums
Koda Kumi video albums
Live video albums

ja:Kingdom